The Men's 4 × 100 metre freestyle relay competition of the 2018 European Aquatics Championships was held on 3 August 2018.

Records
Before the competition, the existing world and championship records were as follows.

Results

Heats
The heats were started at 11:12.

Final
The final was held at 18:10.

References

Men's 4 x 100 metre freestyle relay